Chitralekha is a 1934 Hindi novel by Indian writer Bhagwati Charan Verma. The novel is about the philosophy of life and love, sin and virtue. The novel was written, while the author was still practicing law at Hamirpur and brought him immediate fame, starting his literary career. It is modelled on Anatole France's 1890 novel Thaïs but is set in an Indian background. It was adapted into Hindi films twice - in 1941 and 1964.

Synopsis

Chitralekha is a slim volume of literary work that explores the very essence of the universal truths of human life in a social set up. Woven around an intense love story that reflects on and flashes out not just the various aspects of human nature but also the myriad dilemmas faced by us in our lifetime, Chitralekha - the novel and protagonist - is riveting from the first sight and word. The story starts with a dialogue between the great hermit Ratnambar and his disciples, Shwetank and Vishaldev about sins committed by humans. They ultimately conclude that humans become victims and slaves of circumstance. So, according to Ratnambar -there is no sin and virtue per se. Everyone does deeds according to circumstances that befall them in their lifetime. The author also propounds the views that sin may be in action but never in thought and also that anuraag (attachment/passion) is in desire, and viraag (alienation/lack of passion) comes from gratification (tripti). Through the various twists and turns in the plot, Bhagwaticharan Varma displays a candour and liberalism not otherwise associated with Hindi literature of pre independence India. Through Chitralekha's character, the author describes the life of a truly empowered woman: beautiful and strong from within, materialistic by choice, largehearted by nature and honest to the core. Chitralekha busts many myths surrounding a real and humane woman. She firmly holds the reins of her own life and is commanding in not letting society/ social pressure influence her. Her honesty with herself through introspection and her refusal to let an ego come in the way of atonement lead her to victory in life since she attains peace within passion and passion within peace.

This novel is a love story about a young general, Bijgupta who leads a luxurious life while serving under the Mauryan Empire and  King Chandragupta Maurya( 340 BCE – 298 BCE) and the beautiful dancer and young widow, Chitralekha. Kumargiri -a hermit- also falls in love with Chitralekha and becomes a victim of his circumstances. Shwetaank and Vishaldev wish to find the truth about the holy and the unholy in life, as suggested by their guru, Ratnambar. They become slaves of circumstances too, as does Bijgupta. The other characters are Yashodhara, the princess, and Yashodhara's father, the aged Mritunjay. The character, Chanakya, has been weaved into the novel to make it interesting.

The novel has twenty two riveting sections that clearly demonstrate the futility of being judgmental.

Adaptation
A Hindi movie named Chitralekha released in 1964 directed by Kidar Sharma, was based on this novel. It starred, Ashok Kumar, Meena Kumari and Pradeep Kumar in lead roles. Previously, the same director has made Chitralekha (1941) was also based on the same novel  The novel was translated into Marathi by Malati Cholkar.

References

Bhagwati Charan Verma (1994), Chitralekha, New Delhi: Rajkamal Prakashan.

External links
Chitralekha ,Hindi sahitya

Hindi-language novels
1934 novels
Philosophical novels
Indian novels adapted into films
Historical novels
Works about the Maurya Empire
Novels set in the 3rd century BC
Rajkamal Prakashan books
Cultural depictions of Thaïs (saint)
Novels about Indian prostitution
Novels based on novels
Ancient India in popular culture